Romanas Arlauskas (11 June 1917, Kaunas, Lithuania – 22 September 2009 Adelaide, Australia) was a Lithuanian-born Australian chess player who held the ICCF title of Correspondence Chess Grandmaster.

Arlauskas played at sixth board (+4 –7 =7) in an unofficial Chess Olympiad at Munich 1936. He tied for 1st–3rd, with Birmanas and Leonardas Abramavičius, ahead of Povilas Vaitonis, Povilas Tautvaišas, etc., at the 1943 Lithuanian Chess Championship in Vilnius.

At the end of World War II, Arlauskas, along with many other Baltic players (Leonids Dreibergs, Lucius Endzelins, Miervaldis Jurševskis, Leho Laurine, Edmar Mednis, Karlis Ozols, Ortvin Sarapu, Povilas Tautvaišas, Povilas Vaitonis, Elmārs Zemgalis, etc.) escaped to western Europe, just before the advancing Soviet forces arrived, to avoid deportation to Siberia or any other persecutions by the Soviet occupation (e.g., those of Vladimirs Petrovs). In 1946, Arlauskas placed third, with 10/13, in a round-robin event at Meerbeck. In 1947, Arlauskas tied for 6–7th in Kirchheim. He, like Endzelins, Ozols and Sarapu, migrated from Germany to Australia. Arlauskas won the South Australian championship in 1949.

He finished 3rd in the 4th World Correspondence Championship (1962–1965) and was awarded the GMC title in 1965.

See also
List of Eastern Bloc defectors

References

External links
 
 

1917 births
2009 deaths
Lithuanian chess players
Australian chess players
Correspondence chess grandmasters
20th-century chess players
Lithuanian refugees
Lithuanian emigrants to Australia